Leucopogon altissimus is a species of flowering plant in the heath family Ericaceae and is endemic to a restricted area in the south of Western Australia. It is a tall, erect shrub with glabrous branchlets, elliptic leaves and white or creamy-white flowers in groups in upper leaf axils or on the ends of branches.

Description
The leaves are more or less flat and glabrous, the upper surface shiny and the lower surface a paler shade of green.

Taxonomy and naming
Leucopogon altissimus was first formally described in 2008 by Michael Clyde Hislop in the journal Nuytsia from specimens he collected east of Albany in 2006. The specific epithet (altissimus) means "highest".

Distribution and habitat
This leucopogon mainly grows in a wide variety of habitats from sand dunes near the beach to dense heath on hilltops, but is only known from a small area between Two Peoples Bay, Cheyne Beach and Manypeaks in the Esperance Plains and Jarrah Forest biogeographic regions of southern Western Australia.

Conservation status
Leucopogon altissimus is classified as "Priority Three" by the Government of Western Australia Department of Biodiversity, Conservation and Attractions, meaning that it is poorly known and known from only a few locations but is not under imminent threat.

References

altissimus
Ericales of Australia
Flora of Western Australia
Plants described in 2008